Stean is a small village in upper Nidderdale in North Yorkshire, England.

The village is located on Stean Beck, a tributary of the River Nidd.  Below Stean the beck flows through How Stean Gorge which includes a cave named after Tom Taylor, a highwayman who is rumoured to have hidden there.

External links

Nidderdale
Villages in North Yorkshire